Footscray Town Hall, also known as Maribyrnong Town Hall since council amalgamations in the 1990s, is a civic building located on Napier Street in Footscray, a suburb of Melbourne, Australia. The hall was built in 1936 to the design of architect Joseph Plottel in the Romanesque Revival—Richardson Romanesque  style. It replaced the previous town hall on the same site, which was demolished in 1935. The building is now used as the main council chambers of the City of Maribyrnong.

See also
List of town halls in Melbourne

References

Town halls in Melbourne
Romanesque Revival architecture in Australia
1936 establishments in Australia
Heritage-listed buildings in Melbourne
Buildings and structures in the City of Maribyrnong
Government buildings completed in 1936